The Darkness Beckons is the definitive book on the history of UK cave diving.

It was written by Martyn Farr, a major figure in UK diving at a time when many of the original participants were still alive and available for interview.

Awards

On 10 May 2018 Martyn Farr was advised that the 3rd edition of 'The Darkness Beckons' (published 3 July 2017) had been shortlisted for the 2018 Sports Book Awards in the Illustrated Book of the Year category.

See also 

 Cave Diving Group
 Caving in the United Kingdom

References

Underwater diving books
Caving mass media